The 1981 Mason-Dixon 500 was a NASCAR Winston Cup Series racing event that took place on May 17, 1981, at Dover Downs International Speedway (now Dover International Speedway) in Dover, Delaware.

During the preceding season, NASCAR had completely stopped tracking the year model of all the vehicles and most teams did not take stock cars to the track under their own power anymore. Only manual transmission vehicles were allowed to participate in this race; a policy that NASCAR has retained to the present day.

The NASCAR Winston Cup Series was also plagued with top teams running big engines and finishing in third place to avoid inspection around the time that this race was held.

Background
Dover Downs International Speedway, now called Dover International Speedway, is one of five short tracks to hold NASCAR races; the others are Bristol Motor Speedway, Richmond International Raceway, Martinsville Speedway, and Phoenix International Raceway. The track's turns are banked at twenty-four degrees, and both the front stretch (the location of the finish line) and the backstretch are banked at nine degrees.

Race report
It took four hours and seventeen minutes for Jody Ridley to defeat Bobby Allison by 22 seconds in front of 40,000 live spectators. This race was the only win for a car numbered 90 in the NASCAR Cup Series. It was also the only Cup Series win for Ridley and the only points paying win for Donlavey Racing. However, this victory was controversial because Allison's team blamed a scoring error for his loss (even though Allison himself did not actually protest the win).

The winner would win $22,560 in prize money ($ when adjusted for inflation) while the last place winner would take home only $5,980 ($ when adjusted for inflation). Darrell Waltrip got his Mountain Dew #11 Buick in trouble early when he lost it off Turn 4 and set off a multi-car crash. The Junior Johnson team managed to make repairs and get him back out there, with the high attrition rate they salvaged a 12th place finish and maintained their third place position in the points. 

David Pearson returns to the tour for the first time the Halpern team shut down after the owner's untimely death to take the wheel of Kennie Childers' #12 Kencoal Mining Oldsmobile. The new effort paired two legends of the sport with the Silver Fox driving and Jake Elder acting as crew chief with the pair winning the pole for this race. Unfortunately, engine issues started to arise as the weekend progressed so while Pearson led early in the time one a blown engine eventually sent him to the sidelines just after the one-tenth mark. The partnership of Pearson and the Childers team ended up being just a one-off effort.

Richard Petty was another contender who fell by the wayside in this one. He was running fourth in this race when a rear end failure sent the #43 STP Buick to the sidelines done for a 19th-place finish. Elmo comes out of retirement in a one-off for Lake Speed. Neil Bonnett was ahead by two laps over the entire field when he failed to finish the race after leading 404 laps; quite possibly the most number of laps led in NASCAR history while getting a DNF. In today's NASCAR, it is impossible for someone to finish 20 laps down but in 10th place.

All 32 drivers on the racing grid were American-born males. Benny Parsons would acquire a last-place finish on the first lap due to a crash with Dave Marcis. The lowest finishing driver to finish the race was Cecil Gordon; who was 42 laps behind the lead lap. The tenth-place driver would finish 20 laps down from the lead lap drivers. In today's NASCAR, he would have finished more towards the middle of the pack. There was a "communications meltdown" on lap 480 which put the race in jeopardy. Ridley's win was considered controversial because Allison claimed to have "won the race"; according to NASCAR team owner Harry Ranier.

Qualifying

Finishing order
Section reference:

 Jody Ridley (No. 90)
 Bobby Allison (No. 28)
 Dale Earnhardt† (No. 2)
 D.K. Ulrich (No. 99)
 Ricky Rudd (No. 88)
 Morgan Shepherd (No. 5)
 Buddy Arrington (No. 67)
 Terry Labonte (No. 44)
 Jimmy Means (No. 52)
 Cale Yarborough* (No. 27)
 Donnie Allison (No. 77)
 Darrell Waltrip (No. 11)
 Neil Bonnett*† (No. 21)
 Tommy Gale† (No. 40)
 Cecil Gordon† (No. 24)
 Harry Gant* (No. 33)
 Richard Childress* (No. 3)
 James Hylton*† (No. 48)
 Richard Petty* (No. 43)
 Kyle Petty* (No. 42)
 Mike Alexander* (No. 37)
 Joe Fields* (No. 64)
 J.D. McDuffie*† (No. 70)
 Ronnie Thomas* (No. 25)
 David Pearson*† (No. 12)
 Junior Miller* (No. 79)
 Ron Bouchard*† (No. 47)
 Lowell Cowell* (No. 17)
 Elmo Langley*† (No. 66)
 Bob Riley* (No. 94)
 Dave Marcis* (No. 71)
 Benny Parsons*† (No. 15)

* Driver failed to finish race 
† signifies that the driver is known to be deceased

Timeline
Section reference:
 Start of race: David Pearson had the pole position to start things off.
 Lap 2: Caution called due to an accident involving Benny Parsons and four other drivers, ended on lap 13.
 Lap 18: Caution due to an accident involving Dale Earnhardt and four other drivers, ended on lap 29.
 Lap 42: Neil Bonnett took over the lead from David Pearson.
 Lap 57: David Pearson's engine just could not stand up to the pressures of high-speed racing.
 Lap 58: Cale Yarborough took over the lead from Neil Bonnett.
 Lap 59: Neil Bonnett took over the lead from Cale Yarborough.
 Lap 84: Cale Yarborough took over the lead from Neil Bonnett.
 Lap 85: Neil Bonnett took over the lead from Cale Yarborough.
 Lap 100: Cale Yarborough took over the lead from Neil Bonnett.
 Lap 104: Richard Petty took over the lead from Cale Yarborough.
 Lap 107: Neil Bonnett took over the lead from Richard Petty.
 Lap 161: J.D. McDuffie's engine just could not stand up to the pressures of high-speed racing.
 Lap 191: Cale Yarborough took over the lead from Neil Bennett.
 Lap 196: Neil Bonnett took over the lead from Cale Yarborough.
 Lap 297: Mike Alexander's engine just could not stand up to the pressures of high-speed racing.
 Lap 342: Kyle Petty's engine just could not stand up to the pressures of high-speed racing.
 Lap 412: Richard Childress' engine just could not stand up to the pressures of high-speed racing.
 Lap 448: Harry Gant's engine just could not stand up to the pressures of high-speed racing.
 Lap 459: Neil Bonnett's engine just could not stand up to the pressures of high-speed racing.
 Lap 460: Cale Yarborough took over the lead from Neil Bennett.
 Lap 480: Cale Yarborough's engine just could not stand up to the pressures of high-speed racing.
 Lap 481: Jody Ridley took over the lead from Cale Yarborough.
 Finish: Jody Ridley was officially declared the winner of the event.

Standings after the race

References

Mason-Dixon 500
Mason-Dixon 500
NASCAR races at Dover Motor Speedway